The Canadian Unitarian Council (CUC) is a liberal religious association of Unitarian and Unitarian Universalist congregations in Canada. It was formed on May 14, 1961, initially to be the national organization for Canadians belonging to the Unitarian Universalist Association (UUA) which formed a day later on May 15, 1961. Between 1961 and 2002, almost all member congregations of the CUC were also members of the UUA and most services to congregations in Canada were provided by the UUA. However, in 2002, the CUC formally became a separate entity from the UUA, although the UUA continues to provide ministerial settlement services. Some Canadian congregations have continued to be members of both the CUC and the UUA, while most congregations are only members of the CUC.

The Canadian Unitarian Council is the only national body for Unitarian and Unitarian Universalist congregations in Canada and is a member of the International Council of Unitarians and Universalists.

Organization

The CUC is made up of 46 member congregations and emerging groups, who are the legal owners of the organization, and who are, for governance and service delivery, divided into four regions: "BC" (British Columbia), "Western" (Alberta to Thunder Bay), "Central" (between Thunder Bay and Kingston), and "Eastern" (Kingston, Ottawa and everything east of that). However, for youth ministry, the "Central" and "Eastern" regions are combined to form a youth region known as "QuOM" (Quebec, Ontario and the Maritimes), giving the youth only three regions for their activities. The organization as a whole is governed by the CUC Board of Trustees (Board), whose mandate it is to govern in the best interests of the CUC's owners. The Board is made up of 8 members who are elected by congregational delegates at the CUC's Annual General Meeting. This consists of two Trustees from each region, who are eligible to serve a maximum of two three-year terms. Board meetings also include Official Observers to the Board, who participate without a vote and represent UU Youth and Ministers.

Service delivery
As members of the CUC, congregations and emerging groups are served by volunteer Service Consultants, Congregational Networks, and a series of other committees. There are two directors of regional services, one for the Western two regions, and one for the Eastern two regions. The Director of Lifespan Learning oversees development of religious exploration programming and youth and young adults are served by a Youth and Young Adult Ministry Development staff person.

Annual conference and meeting
Policies and business of the CUC are determined at the Annual Conference and Meeting (ACM), consisting of the Annual Conference, in which workshops are held, and the Annual General Meeting, in which business matters and plenary meetings are performed. The ACM features two addresses, a Keynote and a Confluence Lecture. The Confluence Lecture is comparable to the UUA's Ware Lecture in prestige. In early days this event simply consisted of the Annual General Meeting component as the Annual Conference component was not added to much later. And starting in 2017 the conference portion will only take place every second year. Past ACMs have been held in the following locations:

^Not an ACM, but an "Annual General Meeting" and "Symposium", and unlike ACMs it was organized by the CUC and the Unitarian Universalist Ministers of Canada instead of a local congregation.  #Not a keynote presenter or lecturer, rather a symposium "provocateur".  *Upcoming locations

Principles and sources
The CUC does not have a central creed in which members are required to believe, but they have found it useful to articulate their common values in what has become known as The Principles and Sources of our Religious Faith, which are currently based on the UUA's Principles and Purposes with the addition of an 8th principle adopted by CUC members at a special meeting on November 27, 2021. The CUC had a task force whose mandate was to consider revising them.

The principles and sources as published in church literature and on the CUC website

Formation and relationship to the Unitarian Universalist Association
The CUC formed on May 14, 1961 to be the national organization for Canadians within the about-to-form UUA (it formed a day later on May 15, 1961). And until 2002, almost all member congregations of the CUC were also members of the UUA and most services to CUC member congregations were provided by the UUA. However, after an agreement between the UUA and the CUC, since 2002 most services have been provided by the CUC to its own member congregations, with the UUA continuing to provide ministerial settlement services. And also since 2002, some Canadian congregations have continued to be members of both the UUA and CUC while others are members of only the CUC.

The Canadian Unitarian Universalist youth of the day disapproved of the 2002 change in relationship between the CUC and UUA. It is quite evident in the words of this statement, which was adopted by the attendees of the 2001 youth conference held at the Unitarian Church of Montreal: 

We the youth of Canada are deeply concerned about the direction the CUC seems to be taking. As stewards of our faith, adults have a responsibility to take into consideration the concerns of youth. We are opposed to making this massive jump in our evolutionary progress.

Canadian Unitarian Universalist Women's Association 
The Canadian Unitarian Universalist Women's Association (CUUWA), established in May 2011, is a women's rights organization associated with the CUC. The CUUWA gained initial support from Prairie Women's Gathering and the Vancouver Island Women's retreat, and has since become a nationally-recognized organization.

Mission 
Originally called the Canadian Unitarian Universalist Women's Federation, the organization aims to raise awareness for women's education, rights, and equality of income. The association also aims to change societal attitudes about women and inform society of the issues women have faced locally and internationally. As a part of their mission, the CUUWA circulates educational materials that highlight women's contributions to society. The organization hosts an annual general meeting during the Canadian Unitarian Council Annual Conference.

Name of CUC and playful abbreviation of Unitarian Universalist
While the name of the organization is the Canadian Unitarian Council, the CUC includes congregations with Unitarian, Universalist, Unitarian Universalist, and Universalist Unitarian in their names. Changing the name of the CUC has occasionally been debated, but there have been no successful motions. To recognize this diversity, some members of the CUC abbreviate Unitarian Universalist as U*U (and playfully read it as "You star, you"). Note, not all CUC members like this playful reading and so when these people write the abbreviation they leave out the star (*), just writing UU instead.

See also

 First Unitarian Congregation of Toronto
 Lotta Hitschmanova

References

External links
Official Website of The Canadian Unitarian Council
Official Facebook Page of The Canadian Unitarian Council
Unitarian Service Committee of Canada
The CUC: From Colony to Nation, 1961–2002
Unitarian Universalist Congregations in Canada

1961 establishments in Ontario
Congregational denominations established in the 20th century
Congregationalism in Canada
Religious organizations based in Canada
Religious organizations established in 1961
Supraorganizations
Unitarian Universalism in Canada
Unitarian Universalist organizations